Jhajhariya is a delicacy made of corn, milk, ghee and sugar garnished with raisins and nuts. Grated or coarsely ground fresh sweet corn is slowly roasted in ghee for few hours until it loses most of its moisture and assumes a dry granular form.

The term Jhajariya is referenced in the advertisement for Google entitled Reunion that went viral.

There is a video on YouTube which describes the recipe for making the same.

References

Rajasthani desserts
Maize dishes